Bidder is a surname. It may refer to:

Anna McClean Bidder (1903–2001), British zoologist
Birgit Bidder (born 1986), Swedish musician
Friedrich Bidder (1810–1894), German physiologist and anatomist
George Parker Bidder (1806–1878), British engineer
George Parker Bidder Jr. (1836–1896), British lawyer
George Parker Bidder (marine biologist) (1863–1954), British marine biologist
Joyce Bidder (1906-1999), British sculptor
Marion Bidder (1862–1932), British physiologist

English-language surnames